Electronic Book Review (ebr) is a peer-reviewed scholarly journal with emphasis on the digital. Founded in 1995 by Joseph Tabbi and Mark Amerika, the journal was one of the first to devote a lasting web presence to the discussion of literature, theory, criticism, and the arts.

Overview
Since its inception, ebr has highlighted works characterized by innovation, resistance to genre, and creative use of emerging (electronic and web-specific) media. In 1996, Details referred to the journal as "a new mecca for cutting-edge fiction and criticism." Initially managed in DIY fashion by contributing writers and programmers, by 1997 Anne Burdick joined the staff as design director, later bringing on Ewan Branda for the redesign. Writing in Deep Sites: Intelligent Innovation in Contemporary Web Design, Max Bruinsma characterizes ebr as "an interesting web of critical debates on electronic textuality, cyberculture, and the value of digital design literacy for scholarship and critical writing on the web." Its emphasis on the materiality of text extended to early experiments with form on the site itself, including "glosses," in which comments by a guest curator appear embedded in existing articles, and the "weave" function, which allowed for fluid rearrangement of content "like a virtual loom that weaves different patterns each time you choose a different perspective."

ebr has received institutional support or affiliation from University of Illinois at Chicago, The Center for Literary Computing at West Virginia University, University of Colorado at Boulder, the Department of English, Art Center College of Design at Pasadena, University of Stavanger, the Electronic Literature Organization, and the Consortium on Electronic Literature (CELL). The journal has also enjoyed a long association with distributed literary networks such as Alt-X and the Open Humanities Press, the latter "an international, scholar-led open access publishing collective whose mission is to make leading works of contemporary critical thought available worldwide." ebr is currently edited by Joseph Tabbi, recipient of the ELO/N. Katherine Hayles Award in 2018 for Critical Writing in the field of Electronic Literature.

Books and collaboration
In conjunction with a trilogy of essay collections from MIT Press, ebr published a thread reproducing a portion of the essays while also expanding, critiquing, and responding to the print content. The "First Person" thread exists as an accompaniment to the collections First Person: New Media as Story, Performance, and Game, Second Person: Role-Playing and Story in Games and Playable Media, and Third Person: Authoring and Exploring Vast Narratives by Pat Harrigan and Noah Wardrip-Fruin.

Contributors
Notable contributors include:
Marjorie Perloff
Joseph McElroy
J. Hillis Miller
Stephanie Strickland
Matthew Kirschenbaum
Florian Cramer
Michael Bérubé
Cary Wolfe
N. Katherine Hayles
McKenzie Wark
John Cayley
Nick Montfort
Charles Bernstein

See also
Electronic literature
Hypertext fiction
Postmodernism
Posthumanism
Digital humanities

References

Cultural journals
Literary magazines published in the United States
Publications established in 1995
Open Humanities Press academic journals